THI is an abbreviation and can refer to:
The Hearth Island, relative to theheartisland.com
Technische Hochschule Ingolstadt
Temperature-Humidity Index
Texas Heart Institute
Tim Hortons Inc.
Traffic Homicide Investigator
Toomas Hendrik Ilves (born 1953), Estonian politician, 4th President of Estonia
Tissue Harmonic Imaging, an advanced technique of ultrasonography.

See also
Thi (disambiguation)